Human Garbage is a 1984 live album by the UK underground artist Mick Farren and friends, released under the name The Deviants.

Farren had relocated to New York but a return visit to London gave him the opportunity for this one-off performance with Larry Wallis' Previously Unreleased group at Dingwalls on 3 February 1984. In addition, former MC5 guitarist Wayne Kramer, a long-standing collaborator with Farren, flew in for this performance.

Track listing
"Outrageous Contagious" (Mick Farren, Larry Wallis) – originally on Mick Farren and the Deviants Screwed Up EP
"Broken Statue" (Farren, Wallis) – originally a Mick Farren 1978 single A-side, later on Pink Fairies Kill 'Em and Eat 'Em LP
"Ramblin' Rose" (Fred Burch, Marijohn Wilkin) – originally on MC5's Kick Out the Jams LP
"Hey Thanks" (Wayne Kramer) – originally on Johnny Thunders and Wayne Kramer's Gang War
"Screwed Up" (Farren, Paul Rudolph) – originally on Mick Farren and the Deviants Screwed Up EP
"I Wanna Drink" (Farren, Wallis) – originally on Mick Farren's Vampires Stole My Lunch Money LP
"Taking LSD" (Wallis, Duncan Sanderson) – originally on Pink Fairies Kill 'Em and Eat 'Em LP
"Police Car" (Wallis) – originally a Larry Wallis 1978 single A-side
"Trouble Coming Every Day" (Frank Zappa) – originally on The Mothers of Invention's Freak Out! LP

Personnel
The Deviants
Mick Farren – vocals
Larry Wallis – guitar, vocals
Wayne Kramer – guitar
Duncan Sanderson – bass
George Butler – drums

References

Sounds reviews: Gig, 18 February 1984; LP, 12 May 1984

The Deviants (band) albums
1984 live albums